Maurizio Costanzo (28 August 1938  – 24 February 2023) was an Italian television host, journalist, screenwriter, and film director.

Biography
Costanzo began his career as a journalist, first as a contributing writer to Paese Sera and then as managing editor of the weekly Grazia. In the late 1970s, he was the founding editor of the newspaper L'Occhio. Parallel to his career as a journalist, he worked as a radio and TV host, where he became known for his subtle, low-profile irony.  His most popular show, Bontà loro was a staple of RAI's programming but he was forced to resign after news broke that he was a member of the Propaganda 2 masonic lodge. Costanzo then moved to Silvio Berlusconi's main TV station Canale 5, where he hosted the Maurizio Costanzo Show. It was the first Italiano talk show. The program worked as a talent scout and launched many Italian artists and showmen (like Alessandro Bergonzoni, Dario Vergassola, Walter Nudo, Daniele Luttazzi, Ricky Memphis, David Riondino, Stefano Nosei, Nick Novecento, Claudio Bisio, Platinette, and Enzo Iacchetti), contributing to the popularity of as many others (like Valerio Mastandrea, Giobbe Covatta, Enrico Brignano, Giampiero Mughini, and Afef Jnifen.

Costanzo was the artistic director of Canale 5 until 2009. In 2010 he returned to RAI, presenting the talk show Bontà sua. Since 2011 he also collaborated with Radio Manà Manà.

Costanzo was the "" (an aesthetical and rhetorical consultant for public appearances) of many Italian political leaders. He was a professor at the Università degli Studi Niccolò Cusano.

Costanzo also wrote screenplays for several films. In 1977 he wrote and directed his first and to these days last film, Melodrammore. In 1966 he co-wrote the lyrics of the song "Se telefonando", which was popularized by Mina.

On 14 May 1993, Costanzo, who had expressed delight at the arrest of Sicilian Mafia boss Salvatore Riina, was almost killed by a bomb as he drove down a Rome street; 23 people were injured.

Personal life and death
Costanzo was married four times. In 1963 he married Lori Sammartino, a journalist and photographer fourteen years his senior. He later married another journalist, Flaminia Morando, who left her husband Alberto Michelini for Costanzo. Costanzo and Morando had two children: Camilla (born 1973) and Saverio (born 1975); they divorced in the late 1970s. From 1983 to 1986 Costanzo lived with the actress, voice actress, screenwriter and director Simona Izzo. On 7 June 1989, he married the TV presenter Marta Flavi, but they separated in December 1990 and divorced in 1995. On his 57th birthday, 28 August 1995, Costanzo married Maria De Filippi, a television host and producer, who had been living with him since 1990. In 2004, the couple adopted a 12-year-old boy. Maurizio Costanzo had a strong connection to the village of Ansedonia, in the province of Grosseto, where he had a residence for decades and spent his holidays there together with Maria de Filippi.

On 24 February 2023, in Rome, Costanzo died at the age of 84, likely due to diabetes.

Films

Screenwriter
 1968 – A qualsiasi prezzo, by Emilio P. Miraglia
 1969 – I quattro del pater noster, by Ruggero Deodato
 1969 – Il giovane normale, by Dino Risi
 1970 – Cerca di capirmi, by Mariano Laurenti
 1976 – Al piacere di rivederla, by Marco Leto
 1976 – Bordella, by Pupi Avati
 1976 – La casa dalle finestre che ridono, by Pupi Avati
 1977 – L'altra metà del cielo, by Franco Rossi
 1977 – Una giornata particolare, by Ettore Scola
 1977 – Tutti defunti... tranne i morti, by Pupi Avati
 1978 – Melodrammore, by Maurizio Costanzo
 1978 – Jazz band – Film TV, by Pupi Avati
 1979 – Cinema!!! – Film TV, by Pupi Avati
 1983 – Zeder, by Pupi Avati
 2003 – Per sempre, by Alessandro Di Robilant
 2005 – Troppo belli, by Ugo Fabrizio Giordani
 2007 – Voce del verbo amore, by Andrea Manni

References

External links 

 
 
 Tv: Costanzo a 72 anni torna con 'Bonta' loro'

1938 births
2023 deaths 
Deaths from diabetes
Writers from Rome
Italian television presenters
Italian television journalists
Italian newspaper editors
Italian male journalists
Italian dramatists and playwrights
Academic staff of the Sapienza University of Rome
Academic staff of the Università degli Studi Niccolò Cusano
Italian radio personalities
Italian lyricists
Mass media people from Rome